is a passenger railway station in located in the city of Suzuka,  Mie Prefecture, Japan, operated by the private railway operator Kintetsu Railway. All trains excluding part of limited express trains stop at this station. When Formula 1 Japanese Grand Prix is held at Suzuka Circuit, extra trains terminate and originate at this station for the spectators.

Lines
Shiroko Station is served by the Nagoya Line, and is located 52.9 rail kilometers from the starting point of the line at Kintetsu Nagoya Station.

Station layout
The station was consists of two ground-level island platforms serving four tracks. Ticket gates are located in the building over the platforms and tracks.

Platforms

Adjacent stations

History
Shiroko Station opened on September 10, 1915, as a station on the Ise Railway. It was renamed to its present name on October 1, 1922. The Ise Railway became the Sangu Express Electric Railway's Ise Line on September 15, 1936, and was renamed the Nagoya Line on December 7, 1938. After merging with Osaka Electric Kido on March 15, 1941, the line became the Kansai Express Railway's Nagoya Line. This line was merged with the Nankai Electric Railway on June 1, 1944, to form Kintetsu. A new station building was completed in March 1979.

Passenger statistics
In fiscal 2019, the station was used by an average of 8366 passengers daily (boarding passengers only).

Surrounding area
Mie Prefectural Shiroko High School
Suzuka Municipal Shiroko Elementary School
Bus stop (Shiroko Station West, 白子駅西)
Mie Kotsu
Route 01 for Hiratacho Station via Naka-Asahigaoka Itchome
Route 02 for Suzuka Central Hospital via Suzukashi Station
Route 03 for Suzuka Circuit via Naka-Asahigaoka Itchome
Route 05 for Apita Suzuka and Suzuka Central Hospital
Route 05 for Sakurajima Yonchome and Suzuka Central Hospital
C-BUS (community bus)
Shiroko Hirata Route for Bell City via Tokuda Station and Koudai

See also
List of railway stations in Japan

References

External links

 Kintetsu: Shiroko Station

Railway stations in Japan opened in 1915
Railway stations in Mie Prefecture
Stations of Kintetsu Railway
Suzuka, Mie